Christopher I. Moore is a neuroscientist at Brown University.

Early life and education
Moore studied philosophy and neuroscience at Oberlin College, where he received his A.B., and Massachusetts Institute of Technology, where he received his Ph.D.

Research 
Before working at Brown University, Moore was a member of MIT's McGovern Institute for Brain Research and an associate professor in the Department of Brain and Cognitive Sciences.  At Brown University, he studies the neural mechanisms of perception, in particular the rapid dynamic changes in cortical activity that underlie touch perception. His research includes electrophysiological and optogenetic studies in rodents, particularly the whisker system, a widely studied model for understanding tactile perception.  He also studies human touch perception using behavioral and imaging methods.   One of his current interests is the neural basis of gamma waves, which have been linked to conscious perception and which are altered in disorders such as schizophrenia.  Moore also studies blood flow within the brain.  He is a proponent of the Hemo-Neural Hypothesis, which proposes that changes in cerebral blood flow not only reflect but also influence neural activity.

References

External links
 Moore lab web site
 McGovern Institute for Brain Research
 High-speed video of rat whiskers

Living people
Year of birth missing (living people)
American neuroscientists
Brown University faculty
Oberlin College alumni
Massachusetts Institute of Technology alumni